Hannah Elizabeth Midgley (born 27 October 1993) is an English actress best known for playing Victoria Sugden on the ITV programme Emmerdale. She replaced Jessica Haywood in 1997 and left in July 2006 to concentrate on her studies; she was succeeded by Isabel Hodgins.

In 1995, she played toddler Winrow in A Touch of Frost. In 2014, she played Rosie in the BBC One drama series In the Club. This was her first television role since leaving Emmerdale.

Filmography

Television

References

External links

1993 births
Living people
English child actresses
English soap opera actresses
People from Idle, West Yorkshire